John Eccles Nixon Barnhill (11 April 1905 – 12 December 1971) was an Ulster Unionist Party member of the Senate in the Parliament of Northern Ireland.  Born near Strabane, the son of W. Barnhill, LL.B., Barnhill was educated at Campbell College, Belfast. He was killed by three members of the Official IRA, who later fled across the border, at his home, Brickfield House, near Strabane.  He had been a Senator since 1962 and served as Deputy Speaker from 1967 to 1968.  His home was also destroyed as a result of an explosion during the incident.

A plaque commemorating his murder was unveiled at Stormont on the 30th anniversary of his death on 12 December 2001.

References

1971 deaths
Assassinated politicians from Northern Ireland
People educated at Campbell College
Members of the Senate of Northern Ireland 1961–1965
Members of the Senate of Northern Ireland 1965–1969
Members of the Senate of Northern Ireland 1969–1973
People killed by the Official Irish Republican Army
Ulster Unionist Party members of the Senate of Northern Ireland
Politicians from County Tyrone
People murdered in Northern Ireland
Deaths by firearm in Northern Ireland
1905 births
1971 murders in the United Kingdom